François Bourguignon (born May 22, 1945) is the former Chief Economist (2003–2007) of the World Bank. He has been the Director of the Paris School of Economics, and from 1985 to his retirement in 2013 a professor of economics at the École des Hautes Études en Sciences Sociales in Paris. in 2016 Bourguignon was awarded the Dan David Prize.
He focus on the study of Income and Wealth inequality, Economy wide country studies (Brazil, China, India…), International Trade and Trade policy, Education, and Wealth, income, redistribution and tax policy.

Education 
Trained as a statistician at ENSAE Paris (French National School of Statistics and Economics), François Bourguignon has a PhD from the University of Western Ontario.

Selected publications

Books

Chapters in books 
 
  Pdf version.

Journal articles

See also 
 Poverty-Growth-Inequality Triangle

References 

1945 births
Fellows of the Econometric Society
French officials of the United Nations
French economists
Living people
University of Western Ontario alumni
World Bank Chief Economists